Said Samih Taleb Darwazah (born 1957) is a Jordanian heir and business executive. He serves as the chairman and chief executive officer (CEO) of Hikma Pharmaceuticals, the FTSE 100 multinational generic pharmaceutical manufacturer founded by his father.

Darwazah was born in May 1957, the son of Samih Darwazah, the founder of Hikma Pharmaceuticals, which he joined in 1980. He has a bachelor's degree in Industrial Engineering from Purdue University in the US, and an MBA from INSEAD. Darwazah was appointed CEO in July 2007, and chairman in May 2014.

References

1957 births
Living people
Purdue University College of Agriculture alumni
INSEAD alumni
Jordanian businesspeople
Jordanian chief executives